Roger Vadim Plemiannikov (26 January 1928 – 11 February 2000) was a French screenwriter, film director and producer, as well as an author, artist and occasional actor. His best-known works are visually lavish films with erotic qualities, such as And God Created Woman (1956), Blood and Roses (1960), Barbarella (1968), and Pretty Maids All in a Row (1971).

Early life
Vadim was born Roger Vadim Plemiannikov (sometimes transliterated Plemiannikoff) in Paris. His father, Igor Nikolaevich Plemiannikov, a White Russian military officer and pianist, had emigrated from the Russian Empire and became a naturalized French citizen. He was a vice consul of France to Egypt, stationed in Alexandria, later posting to Mersin, Turkey as a consul. Vadim's mother, Marie-Antoinette (née Ardilouze), was a French actress. Although Vadim lived as a diplomat's child in Northern Africa and the Middle East in his early youth, the death of his father when Vadim was nine years old caused the family to return to France, where his mother found work running a hostel in the French Alps, which was functioning as a way-station for Jews and other fugitives fleeing Nazism.

Vadim studied journalism and writing at the University of Paris, without graduating.

Film career

Marc Allégret
At age 19, he became assistant to film director Marc Allégret, whom he met while working at the Theatre Sarah Bernhardt, and for whom he worked on several screenplays. He was an assistant director on Allegret's Blanche Fury (1948), a commercially unsuccessful melodrama which Allegret made for a British company in English.

Vadim was one of several writers on Allegret's French-British The Naked Heart (1950), aka Maria Chapdelaine, starring Michèle Morgan, as well as serving as assistant director. It was shot in French and English versions. Blackmailed (1951) was another film Allegret directed in England, starring Mai Zetterling and Dirk Bogarde; Vadim was credited as one of the writers. He was also one of several writers on Allegret's, La demoiselle et son revenant (1952).

Vadim did the screenplay and commentary for a documentary, Le gouffre de la Pierre Saint-Marti (1953) and was assistant director on Allegret's Julietta (1953), a popular romance with Jean Marais, Dany Robin and Jeanne Moreau. Vadim wrote Allegret's Loves of Three Queens (1954), with Hedy Lamarr.

Brigitte Bardot
Vadim had begun a relationship with model-actress Brigitte Bardot. She was given a good role in a drama directed by Allegret, School for Love (1953), aka Futures Vedettes, starring Jean Marais; Vadim wrote the script with Allegret. The film was a commercial disappointment.

However the next collaboration between Allegret, Bardot and Vadim, Plucking the Daisy (1956), aka Mam'selle Striptease, was a huge success at the French box office. So too was Naughty Girl (1956), with Bardot. This allowed Vadim to get backing for his first movie as director.

Vadim's first film as director was based on an original story of his, And God Created Woman (1956). Starring Bardot, Curt Jurgens and Christian Marquand and produced by Raoul Levy it was not only a major success in France, but around the world, and established Bardot as a world icon.

Vadim followed it with No Sun in Venice (1957) starring Françoise Arnoul and Marquand, produced by Levy, which was considerably less popular than And God Created Woman. Levy, Vadim and Bardot were to make Paris by Night with Frank Sinatra but Bardot refused to spend months in the US and Sinatra felt likewise about filming in France. Instead Vadim made The Night Heaven Fell (1958), starring Bardot and Stephen Boyd. He was one of several writers on Allegret's popular comedy, Be Beautiful But Shut Up (1958), starring Mylène Demongeot.

Vadims's next film was an adaptation of the book Les liaisons dangereuses (1959), which he wrote and directed. It starred Moreau,  Gérard Philipe (in his final film) and Annette Stroyberg, a Danish model who became Vadim's second wife. The film became a huge hit in France.

Stroyberg was also in the vampire film Blood and Roses (1960). They divorced shortly afterwards.

Vadim was reunited with Bardot for Please, Not Now! (1961), a popular comedy. He was one of several directors of the anthology film, The Seven Deadly Sins (1962).

Vadim began a relationship with a young Catherine Deneuve. She starred in a segment of the anthology film Tales of Paris (1962), which was written by Vadim and directed by Allegret. She starred in a film Vadim helped write and produce, And Satan Calls the Turns (1962), and was also in Vice and Virtue (1963), which Vadim directed.

Vadim had another success writing and directing for Bardot, Love on a Pillow (1962), but found less favour with Nutty, Naughty Chateau (1963) starring Monica Vitti.

Jane Fonda

Vadim tried another adaptation of a classic erotic text, La Ronde (1964). He said at the time, "When I make a picture about relations between people, something erotic comes through; I can't help it! But sex has been an inspiration, the greatest inspiration, since art exists." One of the film's many stars was rising American actress Jane Fonda who began a romantic relationship with Vadim.

Vadim devised a vehicle for Fonda, The Game Is Over (1966), based on a book by Émile Zola. Shot in French and English versions, it was very popular in France, though less so in the US.

Dino de Laurentiis wanted Fonda to star in a science fiction sex comedy, Barbarella (1968) and she agreed provided Vadim could direct. Following this he directed Fonda in a segment of the omnibus horror film Spirits of the Dead (1968) along with her brother Peter Fonda.

During his marriage to Fonda, Vadim would accompany her back to the US periodically while she made movies there. He and Fonda broke up and Vadim directed Pretty Maids All in a Row (1971) for MGM, starring Rock Hudson and Angie Dickinson. It was a commercial disappointment.

Later career
Vadim returned to France. He wrote and directed Hellé (1972), starring Gwen Welles, which was a flop. He was reunited with Bardot for Don Juan, or If Don Juan Were a Woman (1973), which was Bardot's penultimate movie and a commercial disappointment.

Not particularly successful either  were Charlotte (1974), and Game of Seduction (1976) with Sylvia Kristel and Nathalie Delon. He directed a TV movie Bonheur, impair et passe (1977), starring Danielle Darrieux.

In the 1980s Vadim based himself in the US. He directed Night Games (1980), where he attempted to make a star of Cindy Pickett, with whom he became romantically involved. He directed a caper film in Canada, The Hot Touch (1981), starring Marie-France Pisier. Back in France he wrote and directed Surprise Party (1983). He directed episodes of Faerie Tale Theatre (1984) and Deadly Nightmares (1986).

Vadim attempted to recapture his former success with a new version of And God Created Woman (1988), with Rebecca de Mornay. Very different from the original – it only really used the same title – it failed critically and commercially.

His final years were spent working in TV, where he directed Safari (1991) and wrote and directed Amour fou (1993), starring Marie-Christine Barrault who became his final wife. She was also in La Nouvelle tribu (1996) and its sequel Un coup de baguette magique (1997), which Vadim wrote and directed.

Personal life

Romances
Vadim was famous for his romances and marriages to beautiful actresses. In his mid-30s, he lived with the teenaged Catherine Deneuve, by whom he had a child, Christian Vadim, prior to his marriage to Fonda. He was also involved with American actresses Margaret Markov and Cindy Pickett. Later, he cohabited with screenwriter Ann Biderman for several years, announcing their engagement in 1984, but the couple never wed.

Marriages
 Brigitte Bardot, 20 December 1952  – 6 December 1957 (divorced)
 Annette Stroyberg, 17 June 1958  – 14 March 1961 (divorced); 1 daughter (Nathalie) b. 7 December 1957
 Jane Fonda, 14 August 1965  – 16 January 1973 (divorced); 1 daughter (Vanessa)
 Catherine Schneider, 13 December 1975  – 10 June 1977 (divorced); 1 son (Vania)
 Ann Biderman, partner (engaged 1984 but never wed), California
 Marie-Christine Barrault, 21 December 1990  – 11 February 2000 (his death)

He also had two stepsons from his marriage to Schneider (younger sister of novelist Dominique Schneidre and heiress to the Schneider-Creusot steel and armaments firm) as well as adult stepchildren from Barrault's first marriage to Daniel Toscan du Plantier, also a friend of Vadim's, who called him "a happy man. He was someone in whom there was so much satisfaction to the end of his life. The films merely reflected his happiness." Nathalie, his eldest daughter, told Fonda biographer Patricia Bosworth: "Jane was the love of my father's life."

Writing
In addition to Vadim's theatre and film work, he also wrote several books, including the memoirs "Memoires du Diable", "Le Gout du Bonheur: Souvenirs 1940–1958" and an autobiography, D'une étoile à l'autre (From One Star to the Next) as well as a tell-all about his most famous exes, Bardot, Deneuve & Fonda: My Life with the Three Most Beautiful Women in the World, published in 1986. "My attitude is that if this book makes me a little money it will be a tiny compensation for all the money I helped those actresses make", Vadim explained.
He also wrote several plays and books of fiction, including L'ange affamé.

Death
Vadim died of cancer at age 72 on 11 February 2000. Ex-wives Bardot, Fonda, Schneider and Stroyberg were all in attendance at his funeral. He is buried at St. Tropez Cemetery.

Filmography

Writer or director
The Naked Heart (1950)
Blackmailed (1951)
En Effeuillant la Marguerite/Mademoiselle Striptease (1956)
And God Created Woman (1956)
Sait-on jamais? (1957)
Sois belle et tais-toi/Be Beautiful but Shut up (1957)
Les Bijoutiers du Clair de Lune/The Night Heaven Fell (1958)
Les liaisons dangereuses/Dangerous Liaisons (1959)
Blood and Roses (1960)
La Bride sur le cou/Please Not Now! (1961)
Les Sept péchés capitaux/Seven Capital Sins (1962)
Les Parisiennes/Beds and Broads (1962)
Love on a Pillow (1962)
Un château en Suède/Castle in Sweden (1963)
Le vice et la vertu/Vice and Virtue (1963)
La Ronde/Circle of Love (1964)
La Curée/The Game is Over (1966)
Spirits of the Dead (1968)
Barbarella (1968)
Pretty Maids All in a Row (1971)
Hellé (1972)
Don Juan ou Si Don Juan était une femme  (1973)
La jeune fille Assassinée/The Murdered Young Girl (1974)
Une femme fidèle (1976)
Bonheur, impair et passe (1977)
Jeux de Nuit/Night Games (1980)
The Hot Touch (1981)
Surprise Party (1983)
Faerie Tale Theatre (1984 TV, segment "Beauty and the Beast")
The Hitchhiker (1986 TV, segment "Dead Man's Curve")
And God Created Woman (1988)
Safari (1991, TV movie)
Amour fou (1993, TV movie)
La Nouvelle tribu (1996, TV mini-series)
Mon père avait raison (1996, TV movie)
Un coup de baguette magique (1997, TV movie)

Actor
School for Love (1955)
Sweet and Sour (1963)
Ciao! Manhattan (1972)
The Assassinated Young Girl (1974)
Rich and Famous (1981)
Into the Night (1985)

References

External links
 
 Image of Rock Hudson, Gene Roddenberry, and Roger Vadim posing with women cast members for motion picture "Pretty Maids All in a Row", California, 1970. Los Angeles Times Photographic Archive (Collection 1429). UCLA Library Special Collections, Charles E. Young Research Library, University of California, Los Angeles.

1928 births
2000 deaths
French film producers
French male film actors
French male stage actors
Paris Match writers
Male actors from Paris
20th-century French male actors
Deaths from cancer in France
Deaths from lymphoma
Fonda family
Film directors from Paris
French people of Russian descent